The following is a list of Nippon Professional Baseball players with the last name starting with R, retired or active.

R
Brian Raabe
Brady Raggio
Alex Ramirez
Enrique Ramirez
Felix Ramirez
Ramón Ramírez
Roberto Ramírez
Santiago Ramírez
Alex Ramirez
Matthew Randel
Gary Rath
Kenny Rayborn
Randy Ready
Kevin Reimer
Chris Resop
Michael Restovich
Tuffy Rhodes
Keiichi Ri
Jerrod Riggan
Adam Riggs
Daniel Rios
Ben Rivera
Dave Roberts
Boi Rodriguez
Nerio Rodríguez
Mike Romano
Carlos Rosa
Robert Rose
Ryan Rupe

References

External links
Japanese Baseball

 R